Samuel Walker (October 9, 1793 – December 11, 1860) was an American politician, who served as the third Mayor of Roxbury, Massachusetts from 1851 to 1853.  Walker was also the fifth President of the Massachusetts Horticultural Society.

References 
 Forbes, Abner:  The rich men of Massachusetts p. 180. Edition: 2 - (1851).

Notes

 The Memorial History of Boston: Including Suffolk County, Massachusetts. 1630-1880. Justin Winsor (1881).

External links

 

1793 births
1860 deaths
Mayors of Roxbury, Massachusetts
19th-century American politicians